The Voice: la plus belle voix (season 5) is the fifth season of the French reality singing competition, created by media tycoon John de Mol.  It was aired from 30 January 2016 to 14 May 2016 on TF1.

One of the important premises of the show is the quality of the singing talent. Four coaches, themselves popular performing artists, train the talents in their group and occasionally perform with them. Talents are selected in blind auditions, where the coaches cannot see, but only hear the auditioner.

Three of the coaches continued from season 4, namely were Florent Pagny, Zazie and Mika.  But Garou from seasons 1, 2 and 3 and in hiatus for season 4 returned to replace Jenifer. Slimane Nebchi of Team Florent Pagny was the fifth season winner with finale held on May 14, 2016. MB14 from Team Mika was the runner-up.

Overview 

Color key

Results

Results

« Auditions à l'aveugle » (Blind Auditions)

Episode 1 (January 30, 2016)

References

External links 
 

2016 French television seasons
France